Suze Randall (born 18 May 1946) is an English model, photographer, and pornographer. Randall was the first female staff photographer for both Playboy and Hustler. She is one of the early female porn film directors; she made Kiss and Tell in 1980. She is president of adult content website Suze Network.

Life and work
Working first as a nurse, then as a fashion model in the early 1970s, Randall gained attention for erotic photographs she took of her fellow model friends. In 1972, she played an au pair in Éric Rohmer's film Love in the Afternoon. She gave up modelling and devoted her time to erotic photography becoming the first female to shoot Page 3 for The Sun newspaper. After working for years in top adult magazines like Penthouse and Playboy, she now continues her career as a freelance photographer. In recent years, her work has included bondage imagery.

Her breakthrough came when she spotted the pinup model Lillian Müller and photographed her for Playboy. Müller was chosen as Playmate of the Month in August 1975 and subsequently Playmate of the Year in 1976. In a pictorial in Playboy's May 1976 issue, Randall was both photographer and model. She went on to shoot a much more explicit self-portrait in a June 1977 Hustler pictorial.

Randall was staff photographer from 1975 until 1977 for Playboy under the supervision of the magazine's West Coast editor Marilyn Grabowski, then from 1977 until 1979 staff photographer for Hustler. Later she provided Penthouse Pet feature photo layouts for Aria Giovanni, Alexus Winston, Lanny Barby, Stormy Daniels, Nikita, Sunny Leone, Lexus Locklear, Lilly Ann, Silvia Saint, Zdenka, Elizabeth Hilden, Jisel, Tera Patrick, Julie Strain, Racquel Darrian, Aimee Sweet, Swan, and Pamela.

Randall has shot the British Lamb's Navy Rum calendar, has done album covers for recording artists such as Revenge (side project of Peter Hook from New Order) and Robert Palmer, as well as a music video for Capitol Records.

Randall is married to writer Humphry Knipe, who helped write her biographical book Suze (1977), wrote and directed several of her films as Victor Nye, and manages Suze Randall Productions websites. Their daughter, Holly Randall, (born 5 September 1978), is an American erotic photographer who works with her mother and has her own erotic website.

References

External links

1946 births
Women pornographic film directors
Playboy photographers
Penthouse (magazine) people
English female adult models
Living people
British erotic photographers
English pornographers
Artists from Worcester, England
English women photographers
Photographers from Worcestershire
Mass media people from Worcester, England